Apurba Kumar Bardalai (born 4 April 1956), is a retired Major General from the Indian Army. He holds a PhD from Tilburg University, where he is a Member of the Department of Organisation Studies. He is also a Distinguished Fellow at the United Service Institution of India, New Delhi.

Career 
Having completed his training at the Indian Military Academy, Dehradun, Apurba Kumar Bardalai was commissioned into the 15th Battalion, the Rajput Regiment on 11 June 1977. 
Apurba Kumar Bardalai has served on foreign assignments including as Deputy Head of the Mission & Deputy Force Commander at the United Nations Interim Force in Lebanon and as the Commandant of the Indian Military Training Team at Bhutan.

Writing 
Specialising in United Nations peacekeeping, Defence and Security, Apurba Kumar Bardalai has published one book, a PhD Thesis and several Journal Articles and other academic research material in his field.

Books 

 Changing Security Scenario: Implications for UN Peacekeeping, Knowledge World for United Service Institution of India, 2006.
 United Nations Interim Force in Lebanon: Assessment and Way Forward, 2021 (PhD Thesis, soon to be published).

Journal articles and other research material 

 UNIFIL: The many challenges of successful peacekeeping, Journal of Defence Studies, 2016.
 UNPKO and Military Contributions: Challenges and Opportunities for Asia-Pacific Governments, Journal of the United Service Institution of India CXLVII.
 United Nations Peacekeeping Operations: Causes for Failure and Continuing Relevance, Journal of Defence Studies.
 UN Peacekeeping Operations: Perspective of an Indian Peacekeeper, The United Nations Interim Force in Lebanon Multiple Perspectives on a Multinational Peace Operation, ed. Aoun, Elena. Brussels: Peter Lang, 2018.
 A Conceptual Framework for Assessing Traditional Peace Operations, Journal of Defence Studies, 2019.
 India and Humanitarian Assistance in Post Conflict Peace Building, CLAWS Issue Brief, 2015.
 Doklam and the Indo-China Boundary, Journal of Defence Studies, 2018.
 Face Off at Doklam Plateau: Implications for Indo and Bhutan Science and Technology Forum, Manipal University, 2017.
 India China Relation: Is there a thaw?, Science and Technology Forum, Manipal University, 2017.

Honours and decorations 
For his dedication to duty as the Commander of a Mountain Brigade, Apurba Kumar Bardalai was awarded the Vishisht Seva Medal on Republic Day, 2008.

Dates of rank

References 

Living people
Recipients of the Vishisht Seva Medal
National Defence Academy (India) alumni
1956 births
Indian generals
Tilburg University alumni
United Nations peacekeeping